Charles W. Gilman (October 20, 1862 – August 26, 1938) was an American lawyer and politician.

Born in the town of Gilmanton, Buffalo County, Wisconsin, Gilman went to Madison High School. On June 24, 1885, Gilman graduated from University of Wisconsin. Then on June 23, 1886, he graduated from University of Wisconsin Law School and was admitted to the Wisconsin bar. Gilman served as district attorney of Buffalo County, Wisconsin for six years. Gilman also served as mayor of Mondovi, Wisconsin and was a Republican. From 1901 to 1905, Gilman served in the Wisconsin State Assembly. Gilman died in Seattle, Washington from a heart ailment.

Notes

1862 births
1938 deaths
People from Gilmanton, Wisconsin
University of Wisconsin–Madison alumni
University of Wisconsin Law School alumni
District attorneys in Wisconsin
Mayors of places in Wisconsin
Republican Party members of the Wisconsin State Assembly
People from Mondovi, Wisconsin